The Scanlan Building, located at 405 Main Street in Houston, Texas, is an eleven-story, 76,403sq.ft building completed in 1909. Built on the site of the first official home of the president of the Republic of Texas, it was the first building of its size and type to be designed by a major national architect to be built in Houston, and set the style for future construction in the area. It is the only known office building in Houston which was designed by D.H. Burnham & Company of Chicago. The building was the first to be built higher than ten stories, breaking the limit preferred by Houston developer Jesse H. Jones.

The building was first envisioned by Thomas Howe Scanlan, two-time mayor of Houston, to be built on the property he owned at Main and Preston streets.  After his death in 1906, his seven daughters built the building as a memorial to him.  Approximately 85 feet by 101 feet, the building was among the first in Houston to use a fireproof steel skeleton.

It was listed on the National Register of Historic Places on May 23, 1980.

Current use
Workspace provider Novel Coworking purchased the Scanlan Building in June 2014 and renovated the building's interior to provide private offices and co-working space for entrepreneurs and small businesses that need flexible, short-term workspace.

See also
 National Register of Historic Places listings in Harris County, Texas

References

External links

1909 establishments in Texas
Buildings and structures completed in 1909
Buildings and structures in Houston
Chicago school architecture in Texas
National Register of Historic Places in Houston
Office buildings on the National Register of Historic Places in Texas